Chillout 04/The Ultimate Chillout is a compilation album released by Nettwerk. It is the fourth from The Ultimate Chillout franchise.

Track listing 
Adapted from AllMusic and the album's official liner notes.

Charts

References 

2003 compilation albums
Nettwerk Records compilation albums